The UE Junior Warriors is the Junior varsity team of University of the East in the University Athletic Association of the Philippines (UAAP), together with the University of the East senior teams, the UE Red Warriors and the UE Lady Warrior.

Volleyball

UAAP Season 74
The UE Red Warriors Boys’ Volleyball Team was declared the Champion for the eighth consecutive year of the UAAP Boys’ Volleyball Tournament after defeating the University of Santo Tomas in three sets last February 5 at the UE Caloocan Gym. As such, the Boys’ Volleyball team now holds both the most number of championships won in the division with 11, as well as the longest winning streak in the division. The Warriors swept the elimination round of this year’s tournament with 10 wins and zero losses, giving them a twice-to-beat advantage going into the finals. UST, on the other hand, had to hurdle a bout against National University, with whom they shared a 7-wins, 3-losses standing after the elimination round.

The UE Red Warriors Girls’ Volleyball Team, for its part, was the 1st Runner-up in the Girls’ Volleyball Tournament after bowing to De La Salle Zobel at their matches on January 28 and 29, also at the UE Caloocan Gym. First-year student Christine Mhae Tolentino was recognized as the Rookie of the Year and Best Libero, while senior student Pia Gabrielle B. Sarmiento was the Best Receiver.

Championship Tally

Ranking

See also
UE Red Warriors

References

University of the East
College sports teams in Metro Manila
University Athletic Association of the Philippines teams